Pseudonocardia alaniniphila is a bacterium from the genus of Pseudonocardia which has been isolated from forest soil in China.

References

Pseudonocardia
Bacteria described in 1999